Antoine Creek is a stream in Natchitoches Parish, Louisiana, in the United States.

History
Antoine Creek was named for Antoine Grillette, a pioneer settler.

See also
List of rivers of Louisiana

References

Rivers of Natchitoches Parish, Louisiana
Rivers of Louisiana